This is a list of the cities in Kurdistan Region in Iraq.

See also
 The archaeological hills in Erbil

References

 
.Iraqi Kurdistan
Iraqi Kurdistan
Cities

Geography of Iraqi Kurdistan